Bahrain participated in the 2009 Asian Indoor Games in Hanoi, Vietnam on 30 October – 8 November 2009.

Medal winners

References

Sport in Bahrain
Nations at the 2009 Asian Indoor Games
2009 in Bahraini sport
Bahrain at the Asian Games